Welsh regional rugby is the top tier of professional Welsh club rugby and is composed of the Scarlets, Ospreys, Cardiff Rugby and the Dragons which compete in the United Rugby Championship.

The regions were established for the start of the 2003/04 rugby union season. From this date, Wales was represented by a smaller number of regional teams in both the Celtic League and European Cup competitions, where previously the top club sides were entered into them.

Current regions

Cardiff Rugby/Rygbi Caerdydd 

Based in Cardiff, the capital of Wales, Cardiff Rugby (Welsh: Rygbi Caerdydd) play at Cardiff Arms Park and are owned by Cardiff Rugby Ltd, who also own and run Cardiff Rugby Football Club. From 2003 to 2021 the club were known as the Cardiff Blues before changing their name to Cardiff Rugby prior to the start of the 2021-22 season.

Cardiff Rugby are responsible for developing rugby in the city of Cardiff, Vale of Glamorgan, Rhondda Cynon Taf, Merthyr Tydfil and south Powys. There are 75 associate clubs within this wider Cardiff Rugby region including semi professional Pontypridd RFC, Merthyr RFC and the Cardiff RFC Welsh Premiership side.

Cardiff Rugby compete in the United Rugby Championship, which includes teams from Ireland, Scotland, Wales, Italy and South Africa. In addition, Cardiff Blues competed in the Anglo-Welsh Cup and (for the 2017–18 season) the European Rugby Challenge Cup which they won by beating Gloucester in the final 31–30. They previously won the 2008–09 Anglo-Welsh Cup and the 2009–10 European Challenge Cup. For the 2021-22 season, Cardiff will compete in the European Champions Cup.

Scarlets 

Their home ground of the Scarlets is the Parc y Scarlets stadium. They play in the United Rugby Championship and the European Rugby Champions Cup (which replaced the Heineken Cup from the 2014–15 season). The club was originally named the Llanelli Scarlets but was renamed at the start of the 2008–09 rugby season.

The Llanelli Scarlets were founded in 2003, as one of the five (now four) regional teams created by the Welsh Rugby Union (WRU). The Scarlets are affiliated with a number of semi-professional and amateur clubs throughout the area, including Welsh Premier Division sides Llanelli RFC, Carmarthen Quins RFC and Llandovery RFC. Through the 2007–08 season, they played most of their games at Stradey Park in Llanelli, but they have also played matches at the Racecourse Ground in Wrexham. The club's new stadium, Parc y Scarlets, was constructed in nearby Pemberton, and opened in November 2008.

Ospreys/Gweilch 

The Ospreys, formerly the Neath-Swansea Ospreys, compete in the United Rugby Championship and the European Rugby Champions Cup. The team formed as a result of Neath RFC and Swansea RFC combining to create a new merged entity, as part of the new regional structure of Welsh rugby, that began in 2003. They are also affiliated with a number of local semi-professional and amateur clubs, including Welsh Premier Division sides Aberavon RFC, Bridgend Ravens, and original founding clubs Neath and Swansea. The regional area represented by the team has widely become known for rugby purposes as 'Ospreylia'.

Their main home ground is the Swansea.com Stadium, Swansea, although some smaller profile games have been played at the Brewery Field, Bridgend. Ospreys currently play in a black home strip, while the away strip is white and orange. The Ospreys logo consists of an image of an Osprey mask.

The Ospreys are the most successful Welsh team in the history of the Celtic League or Pro12 tournament, having won the competition four times. They also became the first and only Welsh regional team to beat a major touring side, defeating  24–16 in 2006.

Dragons/Dreigiau 

Dragons are owned by the Welsh Rugby Union and play their home games at Rodney Parade, Newport and at other grounds around the region. They play in the United Rugby Championship and the European Rugby Champions Cup/European Rugby Challenge Cup. The region they represent covers an area of southeast Wales including Blaenau Gwent, Caerphilly, Monmouthshire, Newport and Torfaen with a total population approaching 600,000 and they are affiliated with a number of semi-professional and amateur clubs throughout the area, including Pontypool RFC, Caerphilly RFC, Cross Keys RFC, Ebbw Vale RFC and Newport RFC.

Formed in 2003 as a result of the introduction of regional rugby union teams in Wales, the team started life with a third-place finish in the 2003–04 Celtic League, and finished fourth the next season; however, the team finished in the bottom three in each of the next four seasons. In 2007, they reached the semi-finals of the European Challenge Cup, losing to French side ASM Clermont Auvergne 46–29. In 2011, they reached the semi-finals of the Anglo-Welsh Cup, losing to Gloucester. They are yet to make the knock-out stage of the European Rugby Champions Cup.

History

Before regional rugby 
Before regions were introduced to rugby union in Wales, there were nine clubs that played in the Welsh Premiership, the top-level of domestic club rugby in Wales. Since 2001, all of the teams also competed in the Celtic League competition, a cross-border competition involving Welsh, Scottish and Irish teams. Five Welsh clubs were also selected to take part in the Heineken Cup competition, which feature clubs from France, England and Italy in addition to the Celtic nations.

Concerns had been raised about the number of clubs playing at the top level, with regard to Wales not producing enough good-quality players to sustain nine clubs. Good quality players who played for clubs that failed to qualify for Heineken Cup rugby missed out on the experience of playing in such a tournament. In addition, the club game in Wales had struggled to cope financially since Rugby Union turned professional in 1995. Clubs struggled for support, with reigning champions Swansea attracting a crowd of just 932 for a home game against Pontypridd in late 2001.

Region suggestions 
A suggestion to move to a regional structure was made by Graham Henry, then coach of the national Wales side, in December 2001 as he had concerns that the current club system was causing harm to the performance of the national team. Prior to joining Wales, Henry had first-hand experience of a regional structure as coach of the Auckland Blues, a regional franchise team in his native New Zealand. Henry's proposal was for the creation of four sides based in West Wales, South East Wales, the South Wales Valleys and Gwent. All players would be under contract to the Welsh Rugby Union, who would decide which players would play for which region.

Henry resigned from his post as Wales coach in February 2002, before any progress had been made with the plans. His replacement, Steve Hansen, also had coaching experience with a regional franchise in New Zealand, the Canterbury Crusaders, and he also advocated the regional structure.

Six of the clubs that made up the Welsh Premiership suggested that they compete in a reduced size Premier League. The proposal of a six club league was agreed with in principle by the WRU management but the WRU membership rejected the proposal.

In September 2002, the WRU and the clubs that made up the Premiership agreed to discuss and decide on a future structure for the game. Two representatives from the clubs and two from the WRU would discuss all possible options, including making modifications to the existing club structure, provincial rugby, franchises, superclubs and regional mergers.

Steve Hansen favoured option was for four regional teams, with 120 of Wales' top players and eight coaches under contract to the WRU, and spread through the teams as the WRU saw fit. At the end of October, David Moffatt was appointed Group Chief Executive of the Welsh Rugby Union, and he was tasked with reducing the debt of the Union.

Proposals 
At a meeting held between the WRU and the eight Premier League clubs on 5 December 2002, Terry Cobner, the WRU director of rugby, and David Moffett outlined plans for a regional system similar to that used by the Irish Rugby Football Union. The only proposal offered to the clubs was for four regional sides, all of which would be under the control of the Welsh Rugby Union with the existing clubs acting as feeder clubs providing their best players to the regions. The locations of the four regions, and the proposed feeder clubs were as follows:

The proposal was rejected by the Premier League clubs, who had expected five 'superclubs' to be formed made up of partnerships between existing clubs. Two plans had been drawn up with the partnerships arranged as follows:

Option 1

Option 2

The clubs were unable to agree on which plan they wished to submit as their preferred alternative to the WRU's provincial system. Llanelli were keen to stand-alone, citing their previous record in European competition while Neath were reluctant to form a partnership with Swansea, having already agreed in principle to pool resources with Bridgend for European competition.

By the end of January 2003, six of the nine clubs in the Welsh Premiership agreed on a plan that would see four regional franchises, with each club holding 50% of a franchise. Unless otherwise agreed, matches would be equally split between venues of both clubs. The proposed franchises were:

Caerphilly RFC did not oppose the plan, despite not having a role to play in a franchise. However Cardiff RFC and Llanelli RFC were opposed to this structure, stating that it "was not in the best interests of Welsh rugby". Despite Llanelli's intention to pursue legal action against the Union if the plans went ahead, an Extraordinary General Meeting of the WRU was scheduled for 23 February.

All 239 member clubs of the Union had a vote of equal weighting, with a simple majority required for the changes to be implemented. In a bid to get some of the non-Premier League clubs to support the changes, the Union announced that the Premier League would be expanded to 16 clubs under the new proposal, which would result in a number of teams being promoted from the division below. The result of the vote was heavily in favour of the changes, with just seven votes against.

On 19 March, Llanelli RFC issued legal proceedings against the WRU, claiming that the Union were acting unlawfully in breaching an agreement between the clubs and the Union that was signed six years previously and were also in breach of European competition law. Three days later, the WRU announced that a consensus had been reached between them and the clubs to implement a five team regional structure. The structure of the teams had been decided with Cardiff and Llanelli each having a region whilst the remaining 6 clubs each held 50% of a region. However further meetings were scheduled to discuss outstanding issues.

Agreement 

The introduction followed much controversy, as clubs disagreed with the Welsh Rugby Union (WRU), the governing body of the sport in Wales, over many issues, including the forming of partnerships, funding levels, loss of status and both the number and locations of regional teams.

On 1 April 2003, David Moffett announced that the clubs and Union had come to an agreement to implement the five regional teams, which had been approved by the WRU Board of Directors. The details were submitted to the Heineken Cup organisers, ERC, by the 2 April deadline, and the process of setting up companies to own the regions began. The five regions were:

Further reform 

Celtic Warriors was acquired and liquidated by the WRU at the end of the 2003–04 season, leaving four Welsh regional sides and redrawn catchment areas.

Llanelli Scarlets and Neath-Swansea Ospreys dropped their geographical location in their name to become Scarlets and Ospreys respectively whilst Gwent Dragons added "Newport" to their name as Ebbw Vale RFC dropped out and were replaced by the WRU. More recently, the Newport Gwent Dragons dropped both of their regional identifiers after the 2016–17 season, becoming simply Dragons. This change of identity coincided with the WRU acquiring Newport RFC's 50% stake in the regional side.

In 2008, Regional Rugby Wales was established as the association of the four regional teams. It was renamed Pro Rugby Wales in 2014.

2010s 
Since the regionalisation of professional Rugby Union in Wales, the national team has undoubtedly experienced great success, winning the Six Nations Grand Slam in 2005, 2008, 2012, and 2019, as well as winning the championship for a fourth time in 2013 and a fifth time in 2021. Some have attributed this success to the regional concept.

The regions have been reasonably successful in the Pro12 (renamed Pro14 from 2017 to 2018 forward), with Welsh teams winning on 5 separate occasions. The Ospreys are the most successful team in the history of the league with four titles, a record they share with Leinster. However, the Welsh sides have made little impact in the European Cup, with no team getting further than the semi-finals. A desire for success in Europe had been one of the principal reasons for setting up the regions in the first place.

While average attendances at regional matches are generally higher than those at any one club had been before regionalisation, the total numbers attending top-flight Rugby in Wales have remained relatively stable, or even declined since 2003 due to the smaller number of teams and matches. While average attendances at all the Welsh regions have steadily grown since 2003 and are generally higher than the Scottish and Italian teams with whom they share the Pro14, they are far behind those at the Irish teams and are generally lower than in the English Premiership and French Top 14. This may be due to a failure of the regional sides to properly embrace the regional concept, with some being perceived as little more than extensions of former club sides unlikely to gain support among followers of former rivals. Supporters of Pontypridd RFC for example may find it difficult to get behind their regional side Cardiff Blues, who share colours, name and a stadium with traditional rivals Cardiff RFC. This has led to occasional calls either for the establishment of new regions to better represent those sides who feel unrepresented under the current system, or for the scrapping of the regions and a return to a club-based system.

Financial stability was one of the motivations for the establishment of the regions, yet the regions have remained financially unstable ever since their establishment as crowds and TV revenue have failed to materialise, with the Celtic Warriors franchise in particular lasting only one year.

Future 

The future of regional rugby in Wales will likely depend on the sporting and financial success or failure of the existing regional franchises as well as changes in the wider context of European club rugby.

Since the demise of the Celtic Warriors, the South Wales Valleys, traditionally a heartland of Rugby, has been without a representative team. This has led to a huge part of the country being left disenfranchised from top level rugby. There have been occasional calls to resurrect the franchise or establish a new Valleys professional team as a fifth region. Valleys Rugby was established as an attempt to achieve this aim, with a new side based in Pontypridd. However, any fifth region would require additional funding or reduce the funding available to the remaining regions from the WRU and TV rights, as well as reducing their number of feeder clubs and potentially drawing away their support.

North Wales was nominally part of the Scarlets' region at the introduction of regional rugby. Despite containing a significant part of the Welsh population, rugby has traditionally been less well established in the north. As a means to develop rugby in the area, the WRU established RGC 1404 in 2008 as a north Wales representative development side, based in Colwyn Bay. RGC 1404 currently play in the Welsh Premiership. Promotion and relegation is not possible between the top northern league, WRU Division One North, and the rest of the Welsh Rugby Union pyramid, and Rugby clubs in the north act as 'feeder' clubs to RGC 1404 in much the same way as the professional regions have their own feeder clubs among the semi-professional Welsh sides. Thus, although not a full-time professional side, RGC 1404 operate as a de facto fifth region: unlike the other teams at their level they are not themselves a feeder club to any of the professional regions. RGC 1404 have their own academy and have contributed players to the national U-20 side.

Disagreements between the regional teams and the WRU during the 2013–14 season led to questions as to whether the existing regions would continue to play in the Pro12 in 2014–15, with the regions threatening to join the English premiership. The WRU stated it would consider setting up new regional teams to play in the Pro12 and European competitions should this happen. This ultimately didn't happen however following the signing of a new participation agreement.

In 2018 and 2019 the Welsh Rugby Union launched plans labelled Project Reset, led by a Professional Rugby Board, to start discussions of reforming salaries and the regional club system.

References